Lorenzo Viani (November 1, 1882 – November 2, 1936) was an Italian painter, engraver, writer and poet.

Life and career 
Lorenzo Viani was born on November 1, 1882, in Livorno, Italy.

Viani died on November 2, 1936.

The Galleria d'Arte Moderna e Contemporanea, Viareggio, holds the largest collection of his most important work. The museum which is also named after him holds 85 of his works.

References 

1882 births
1936 deaths